Alabaster is a mineral or rock that is soft, often used for carving, and is processed for plaster powder. Archaeologists and the stone processing industry use the word differently from geologists. The former use it in a wider sense that includes varieties of two different minerals: the fine-grained massive type of gypsum and the fine-grained banded type of calcite. Geologists define alabaster only as the gypsum type. Chemically, gypsum is a hydrous sulfate of calcium, while calcite is a carbonate of calcium.

The two types of alabaster have similar properties. They are usually lightly colored, translucent, and soft stones. They have been used throughout history primarily for carving decorative artifacts.

The calcite type is also denominated "onyx-marble", "Egyptian alabaster", and "Oriental alabaster" and is geologically described as either a compact banded travertine or "a stalagmitic limestone marked with patterns of swirling bands of cream and brown". "Onyx-marble" is a traditional, but geologically inaccurate, name because both onyx and marble have geological definitions that are distinct from even the broadest definition of "alabaster".

In general, ancient alabaster is calcite in the wider Middle East, including Egypt and Mesopotamia, while it is gypsum in medieval Europe. Modern alabaster is probably calcite but may be either. Both are easy to work and slightly soluble in water. They have been used for making a variety of indoor artwork and carving, and they will not survive long outdoors.

The two kinds are readily distinguished by their different hardnesses: gypsum alabaster (Mohs hardness 1.5 to 2) is so soft that a fingernail scratches it, while calcite (Mohs hardness 3) cannot be scratched in this way but yields to a knife. Moreover, calcite alabaster, being a carbonate, effervesces when treated with hydrochloric acid, while gypsum alabaster remains almost unaffected.

Etymology

The origin of "alabaster" is in Middle English through Old French "", in turn derived from Latin "", and that from Greek "" ("") or "" (""). The Greek words denoted a vase of alabaster.

The name may be derived further from ancient Egyptian "", which refers to vessels of the Egyptian goddess Bast. She was represented as a lioness and frequently depicted as such in figures placed atop these alabaster vessels. Ancient Roman authors Pliny the Elder and Ptolemy wrote that the stone used for ointment jars called alabastra came from a region of Egypt known as Alabastron or Alabastrites.

Properties and usability
The purest alabaster is a snow-white material of fine uniform grain, but it often is associated with an oxide of iron, which produces brown clouding and veining in the stone. The coarser varieties of gypsum alabaster are converted by calcination into plaster of Paris, and are sometimes known as "plaster stone".

The softness of alabaster enables it to be carved readily into elaborate forms, but its solubility in water renders it unsuitable for outdoor work. If alabaster with a smooth, polished surface is washed with dishwashing liquid, it will become rough, dull and whiter, losing most of its translucency and lustre. The finer kinds of alabaster are employed largely as an ornamental stone, especially for ecclesiastical decoration and for the rails of staircases and halls.

Modern processing

Working techniques
Alabaster is mined and then sold in blocks to alabaster workshops. There they are cut to the needed size ("squaring"), and then are processed in different techniques: turned on a lathe for round shapes, carved into three-dimensional sculptures, chiselled to produce low relief figures or decoration; and then given an elaborate finish that reveals its transparency, colour, and texture.

Marble imitation
In order to diminish the translucency of the alabaster and to produce an opacity suggestive of true marble, the statues are immersed in a bath of water and heated gradually—nearly to the boiling point—an operation requiring great care, because if the temperature is not regulated carefully, the stone acquires a dead-white, chalky appearance. The effect of heating appears to be a partial dehydration of the gypsum. If properly treated, it very closely resembles true marble and is known as "marmo di Castellina".

Dyeing
Alabaster is a porous stone and can be "dyed" into any colour or shade, a technique used for centuries. For this the stone needs to be fully immersed in various pigmentary solutions and heated to a specific temperature. The technique can be used to disguise alabaster. In this way a very misleading imitation of coral that is called "alabaster coral" is produced.

Types, occurrence, history

Typically only one type is sculpted in any particular cultural environment, but sometimes both have been worked to make similar pieces in the same place and time. This was the case with small flasks of the alabastron type made in Cyprus from the Bronze Age into the Classical period.

Window panels
When cut in thin sheets, alabaster is translucent enough to be used for small windows. It was used for this purpose in Byzantine churches and later in medieval ones, especially in Italy. Large sheets of Aragonese gypsum alabaster are used extensively in the contemporary Cathedral of Our Lady of the Angels, which was dedicated in 2002 by the Los Angeles, California Archdiocese. The cathedral incorporates special cooling to prevent the panes from overheating and turning opaque. The ancients used the calcite type, while the modern Los Angeles cathedral is using gypsum alabaster. There are also multiple examples of alabaster windows in ordinary village churches and monasteries in northern Spain.

Calcite alabaster

Calcite alabaster, harder than the gypsum variety, was the kind primarily used in ancient Egypt and the wider Middle East (but not Assyrian palace reliefs), and is also used in modern times. It is found as either a stalagmitic deposit from the floor and walls of limestone caverns, or as a kind of travertine, similarly deposited in springs of calcareous water. Its deposition in successive layers gives rise to the banded appearance that the marble often shows on cross-section, from which its name is derived: onyx-marble or alabaster-onyx, or sometimes simply (and wrongly) as onyx.

Egypt and the Middle East
Egyptian alabaster has been worked extensively near Suez and Assiut.

This stone variety is the "alabaster" of the ancient Egyptians and Bible and is often termed Oriental alabaster, since the early examples came from the Far East. The Greek name alabastrites is said to be derived from the town of Alabastron in Egypt, where the stone was quarried. The locality probably owed its name to the mineral; the origin of the mineral name is obscure (though see above).

The "Oriental" alabaster was highly esteemed for making small perfume bottles or ointment vases called alabastra; the vessel name has been suggested as a possible source of the mineral name. In Egypt, craftsmen used alabaster for canopic jars and various other sacred and sepulchral objects. The sarcophagus of Seti I, found in his tomb near Thebes, is on display in Sir John Soane's Museum, London; it is carved in a single block of translucent calcite alabaster from Alabastron.

Algerian onyx-marble has been quarried largely in the province of Oran.

Calcite alabaster was quarried in ancient Israel in the cave known today as the Twins Cave near Beit Shemesh. Herod used this alabaster for baths in his palaces.

North America
In Mexico, there are famous deposits of a delicate green variety at La Pedrara, in the district of Tecali, near Puebla. Onyx-marble occurs also in the district of Tehuacán and at several localities in the US including California, Arizona, Utah, Colorado and Virginia.

Gypsum alabaster
Gypsum alabaster is the softer of the two varieties, the other being calcite alabaster. It was used primarily in medieval Europe, and is also used in modern times.

Ancient and Classical Near East

"Mosul marble" is a kind of gypsum alabaster found in the north of modern Iraq, which was used for the Assyrian palace reliefs of the 9th to 7th centuries BC; these are the largest type of alabaster sculptures to have been regularly made. The Lion Hunt of Ashurbanipal and military Lachish reliefs, both 7th century and in the British Museum, are some of the best known.

Gypsum alabaster was widely used for small sculpture for indoor use in the ancient world, especially in ancient Egypt and Mesopotamia. Fine detail could be obtained in a material with an attractive finish without iron or steel tools. Alabaster was used for vessels dedicated for use in the cult of the deity Bast in the culture of the ancient Egyptians, and thousands of gypsum alabaster artifacts dating to the late 4th millennium BC also have been found in Tell Brak (present day Nagar), in Syria.

In Mesopotamia, gypsum alabaster was the material of choice for figures of deities and devotees in temples, as in a figure believed to represent the deity Abu dating to the first half of the 3rd millennium BC and currently kept in New York.

Aragon, Spain

Much of the world's alabaster extraction is performed in the centre of the Ebro Valley in Aragon, Spain, which has the world's largest known exploitable deposits. According to a brochure published by the Aragon government, alabaster has elsewhere either been depleted, or its extraction is so difficult that it has almost been abandoned or is carried out at a very high cost. There are two separate sites in Aragon, both are located in Tertiary basins. The most important site is the Fuentes-Azaila area, in the Tertiary Ebro Basin. The other is the Calatayud-Teruel Basin, which divides the Iberian Range in two main sectors (NW and SE).

The abundance of Aragonese alabaster was crucial for its use in architecture, sculpture and decoration. There is no record of likely use by pre-Roman cultures, so perhaps the first ones to use alabaster in Aragon were the Romans, who produced vessels from alabaster following the Greek and Egyptian models. It seems that since the reconstruction of the Roman Wall in Zaragoza in the 3rd century AD with alabaster, the use of this material became common in building for centuries. Muslim Saraqusta (today, Zaragoza) was also called "Medina Albaida", the White City, due to the appearance of its alabaster walls and palaces, which stood out among gardens, groves and orchards by the Ebro and Huerva Rivers.

The oldest remains in the Aljafería Palace, together with other interesting elements like capitals, reliefs and inscriptions, were made using alabaster, but it was during the artistic and economic blossoming of the Renaissance that Aragonese alabaster reached its golden age. In the 16th century sculptors in Aragon chose alabaster for their best works. They were adept at exploiting its lighting qualities and generally speaking the finished art pieces retained their natural color.

Volterra (Tuscany)

In Europe, the centre of the alabaster trade today is Florence, Italy. Tuscan alabaster occurs in nodular masses embedded in limestone, interstratified with marls of Miocene and Pliocene age. The mineral is worked largely by means of underground galleries, in the district of Volterra. Several varieties are recognized—veined, spotted, clouded, agatiform, and others. The finest kind, obtained principally from Castellina, is sent to Florence for figure-sculpture, while the common kinds are carved locally, into vases, lights, and various ornamental objects. These items are objects of extensive trade, especially in Florence, Pisa, and Livorno.

In the 3rd century BC the Etruscans used the alabaster of Tuscany from the area of modern-day Volterra to produce funeral urns, possibly taught by Greek artists. During the Middle Ages the craft of alabaster was almost completely forgotten. A revival started in the mid-16th century, and until the beginning of the 17th century alabaster work was strictly artistic and did not expand to form a large industry.

In the 17th and 18th centuries production of artistic, high-quality Renaissance-style artifacts stopped altogether, being replaced by less sophisticated, cheaper items better suited for large-scale production and commerce. The new industry prospered, but the reduced need of skilled craftsmen left only few still working. The 19th century brought a boom to the industry, largely due to the "traveling artisans" who went and offered their wares to the palaces of Europe, as well as to America and the East.

In the 19th century new processing technology was also introduced, allowing for the production of custom-made, unique pieces, as well as the combination of alabaster with other materials. Apart from the newly developed craft, artistic work became again possible, chiefly by Volterran sculptor Albino Funaioli. After a short slump, the industry was revived again by the sale of mass-produced mannerist Expressionist sculptures, and was further enhanced in the 1920s by a new branch creating ceiling and wall lamps in the Art Deco style and culminating in the participation at the 1925 International Exposition of Modern Industrial and Decorative Arts from Paris. Important names from the evolution of alabaster use after World War II are Volterran Umberto Borgna, the "first alabaster designer", and later on the architect and industrial designer Angelo Mangiarotti.

England and Wales

Gypsum alabaster is a common mineral, which occurs in England in the Keuper marls of the Midlands, especially at Chellaston in Derbyshire, at Fauld in Staffordshire, and near Newark in Nottinghamshire. Deposits at all of these localities have been worked extensively.

In the 14th and 15th centuries its carving into small statues and sets of relief panels for altarpieces was a valuable local industry in Nottingham, as well as a major English export. These were usually painted, or partly painted. It was also used for the effigies, often life size, on tomb monuments, as the typical recumbent position suited the material's lack of strength, and it was cheaper and easier to work than good marble. After the English Reformation the making of altarpiece sets was discontinued, but funerary monument work in reliefs and statues continued.

Besides examples of these carvings still in Britain (especially at the Nottingham Castle Museum, British Museum, and Victoria and Albert Museum), trade in mineral alabaster (rather than just the antiques trade) has scattered examples in the material that may be found as far afield as the Musée de Cluny, Spain, and Scandinavia.

Alabaster also is found, although in smaller quantity, at Watchet in Somerset, near Penarth in Glamorganshire, and elsewhere. In Cumbria it occurs largely in the New Red rocks, but at a lower geological horizon. The alabaster of Nottinghamshire and Derbyshire is found in thick nodular beds or "floors" in spheroidal masses known as "balls" or "bowls" and in smaller lenticular masses termed "cakes". At Chellaston, where the local alabaster is known as "Patrick", it has been worked into ornaments under the name of "Derbyshire spar"―a term more properly applied to fluorspar.

Black alabaster

Black alabaster is a rare anhydrite form of the gypsum-based mineral. This black form is found in only three veins in the world, one each in United States, Italy, and China.

Alabaster Caverns State Park, near Freedom, Oklahoma is home to a natural gypsum cave in which much of the gypsum is in the form of alabaster. There are several types of alabaster found at the site, including pink, white, and the rare black alabaster.

Gallery

Ancient and Classical Near East

European Middle Ages

Modern

See also

Mineralogy
 – mineral consisting of calcium carbonate; archaeologists and stone trade professionals, unlike mineralogists, call one variety of calcite "alabaster"
 – mineral composed of calcium sulfate dihydrate; alabaster is one of its varieties
 – a mineral closely related to gypsum
 – the main inorganic compound of gypsum
 – translucent sheets of marble or alabaster used during the Early Middle Ages for windows instead of glass

Window and roof panels
Chronological list of examples:
 – 5th century, Ravenna
 – 6th century, Ravenna
 – mainly 13th–14th century, Valencia, Spain; the lantern of the octagonal crossing tower
 – 14th-century, Orvieto, Umbria, central Italy
 – 17th century, Rome; alabaster window by Bernini (1598–1680) used to create a "spotlight"
 – 1924, Jerusalem, architect: Antonio Barluzzi. Windows fitted with dyed alabaster panels.
 – 1924, Mount Tabor, architect: Antonio Barluzzi. Alabaster roofing was attempted.

References

Further reading
 Harrell J.A. (1990), "Misuse of the term 'alabaster' in Egyptology," Göttinger Miszellen, 119, pp. 37–42.
 Mackintosh-Smith T. (1999), "Moonglow from Underground". Aramco World May–June 1999.

External links

 More about alabaster and travertine, brief guide explaining the confusing, different use of the same terms by geologists, archaeologists and the stone trade. Oxford University Museum of Natural History, 2012
Alabaster Craftmanship in Volterra
 

 
Calcium minerals
Carbonate minerals
Sulfate minerals
Minerals
Stone (material)
Sculpture materials
Bastet